Dialed In (foaled February 6, 2008) is an American Thoroughbred racehorse. He won the 2011 Florida Derby and Holy Bull Stakes, before finishing 8th in the Kentucky Derby. He is also the sire of multiple graded stakes winner Gunnevera.

Background and Family 
Dialed In was sired by Mineshaft, a son of A.P. Indy. His dam, Miss Doolittle, was graded stakes placed, and also produced stakes-winning filly Broadway Gold (by Seeking The Gold) and stakes-placed colt Mambo Master (by Kingmambo).

Owner Robert LaPenta bought Dialed In for $475,000 at Fasig-Tipton Saratoga select yearling sale in 2009. Dialed In was trained by Nick Zito during his racing career.

Racing career

2010: Two-year-old season
Dialed In ran only once as a juvenile, winning a November Maiden Special Weight event over a distance of  furlongs at Churchill Downs.

2011: Three-year-old season
Dialed In began his three-year-old season with a win in the Gr. III Holy Bull Stakes, after which he ran second in an allowance race. He won the Florida Derby in his next start.

Dialed In was made the 5-1 favorite for the 2011 Kentucky Derby after his previous wins, but finished 8th, to winner Animal Kingdom. He made his next start in the Preakness Stakes, improving to finish fourth. After the Preakness, it was discovered that Dialed In had sustained a bone chip injury in his right knee, and underwent surgery.

2012: Four-year-old season
Dialed In did not start again until March of the next year, in an allowance race at Gulfstream Park. He finished fourth in what was his final career start.

Statistics

Retirement and stud career 
Dialed In retired in 2012 to Darby Dan Farm in Lexington, Kentucky, and begin his breeding career in 2013. His first stud fee was set at $7,500, and remained the price for four years until doubling in 2017 after meeting success as a stallion. Dialed In's first foal was born January 13, 2014, at Sierra Farm near Lexington. The chestnut colt, later named Dial Josh, was out of the Gr.II winning mare Diadella (by Diesis (horse)).

Dialed In's first starter, the gray filly Maximum Edge, was also his first winner. Maximum Edge is also the first winner and first foal for dam Champagne Sparkle, an unraced full-sister to Arkansas Derby winner Danza and a half-sister to Rockport Harbor. Dialed In saw his first black-type stakes winner shortly afterwards, when Ruffenuff won the Princess Margaret Stakes by more than 6 lengths at Northlands Park.

Dialed In's most successful offspring to date is Gunnevera, winner of the Fountain of Youth Stakes, Saratoga Special Stakes, and  Delta Jackpot Stakes. Gunnevera finished seventh in the 2017 Kentucky Derby and fifth in the Preakness. Gunneavera amassed $5,561,800 in stakes with Grade I placings in the Breeders' Cup Classic, Dubai World Cup and Woodward Stakes.    

Dialed In is also the sire of graded stakes winner The Tabulator, winner of the 2017 Iroquois Stakes  He also sired stakes winners Chalon, Montu, Ruffenuff and It's Your Nickel.

Get Her Number was Dialed In's first offspring to win a Grade 1 in the United States when he won in 2020 the American Pharoah Stakes at Santa Anita.

Dialed In's fee was lowered in 2021 from $20,000 to $15,000.

Notable progeny
His major stakes winners include:
c = colt, f = filly, g = gelding''

Pedigree

Dialed In is inbred 4s × 4d to Secretariat.

References

2008 racehorse births
Thoroughbred family 37
Racehorses bred in Kentucky
Racehorses trained in the United States
American Grade 1 Stakes winners